Luhnu Cricket Ground is a cricket ground in Bilaspur, Himachal Pradesh, India.  The first recorded match on the ground came when Himachal Pradesh Under-16s played Jammu and Kashmir Under-16s in 1999.  The ground held its first first-class match in 2001 when Himachal Pradesh played Delhi in the 2001/02 Ranji Trophy.  The following season a further first-class match was held when Himachal Pradesh played Hyderabad in the 2002/03 Ranji Trophy.  No further major matches have been staged there.

References

External links
Lohnu Cricket Ground at ESPNcricinfo
Lohnu Cricket Ground at CricketArchive

Cricket grounds in Himachal Pradesh
Defunct cricket grounds in India
Bilaspur, Himachal Pradesh
Buildings and structures in Bilaspur district, Himachal Pradesh
1999 establishments in Himachal Pradesh
Sports venues completed in 1997
20th-century architecture in India